Love and War may refer to:

Books 
Love and War, a 1984 novel by John Jakes in the North and South trilogy
Love and War (Dragonlance), a 1987 anthology of Dragonlance fantasy short stories
Love and War (Cornell novel), a 1992 novel based on the TV series Doctor Who

Film and television 
Love & War (TV series), a 1990s American sitcom
Love and War (Iraqi TV series), 2003
Love and War (Australian TV series), 1967
Love and War (2006 film), a Swedish animated film
Love and War (1967 film), an Australian TV movie
The Clinic for Married Couples: Love and War, a South Korean TV program

Music

Albums
Love and War (Tamar Braxton album), 2013
 Love + War (Lillian Axe album), 1989
 Love + War (Kwabs album), 2015
Love & War (Daniel Merriweather album), 2009
Love & War (BarlowGirl album), 2009
Love & War (Jerzee Monét album), 2002
Love and War, by The Pets
Love and War (Brad Paisley album), 2017

Songs
"Love and War" (Banks & Steelz song)
"Love and War" (Tamar Braxton song)
"Love and War", a single by Desensitized from Desensitized 2004
"Love and War", a song by Neil Young from Le Noise 2010
"Love and War", a song by Rita Ora from Ora 2012
"Love and War", a song by Diane Birch from Speak a Little Louder 2013 
"Love and War", a song by Anthony Hamilton from Soulife 2005
"Love and War (11/11/46)", a song by Rilo Kiley from More Adventurous 2004

See also
Love and War in the Apennines, a 1971 World War II memoir by Eric Newby
Palaran: Poems of Love and War, classical composition by Jack Body
In Love and War (disambiguation)
"Love in War", a 2003 song by Outkast
Love Is War (disambiguation)